Nalin H. Samarasinha (born 1958) is a Sri Lankan born planetary scientist and a discoverer of minor planets, who studies the dynamical evolution and processes of cometary nuclei and comae. Currently, he works as a senior scientist for the Planetary Science Institute in the United States.

Early life 

Samarasinha earned a BSc first class honours in Physics from University of Colombo after schooling at Hena Vidyalaya, Mt. Lavinia and Nalanda College Colombo. Later he gained a MSc in astronomy from University of Maryland, College Park USA and followed it up furthering studies graduating with a PhD in Astronomy from the University of Maryland.

Discoveries and honours 

Florian asteroid 12871 Samarasinha, discovered by astronomers with the LONEOS survey in 1998, was named in his honor. The official  was published by IAU's Minor Planet Center on 24 July 2002. He is the first native born citizen of Sri Lanka to gain the distinction of having an asteroid named after him. Together with astronomer Tod R. Lauer, he is credited with the discovery of asteroid .

References

External links 
 Nalin Samarasinha, staffpage at the Planetary Science Institute
 Dr.Nalin Samarasinha: What Comets Can Teach Us, smritidaniel.com
 ISON Observing Campaign, isoncampaign.org

Sri Lankan Buddhists
Sinhalese academics
Sinhalese physicists
Alumni of Nalanda College, Colombo
Sinhalese engineers
American people of Sri Lankan descent
Living people
1958 births
Discoverers of minor planets